In mathematics, the Wirtinger plane sextic curve, studied by Wirtinger,  is a degree 6 genus 4 plane curve with double points at the 6 vertices of a complete quadrilateral.

References

Sextic curves